Bernard Jennings (1928-2017) was an English adult educationist and historian.  He was president of the Workers' Educational Association in the 1980s, and was known for his local histories of Yorkshire.

Jennings was born in Nelson, Lancashire in 1928.  He was educated at St Mary's College in Blackburn and the College of St Mark and St John in London.  After national service in the Army Education Corps he joined the Workers' Educational Association as an organising tutor in Yorkshire.  In 1958 he took a master's degree in adult education at Leeds University, and then became a lecturer at Leeds.  In 1973 he moved to Hull University, where he stayed until his retirement in 1995, until 1993 as Professor of Adult Education and then as Professor of Regional and Local History.

He published 17 books on adult education and local history.  Three of the books were written with local groups of WEA students, and provided a model for collaborative local history projects.

Jennings was active in Liberal politics.  In 1954 he became a county councillor for Richmond in the North Riding of Yorkshire, and in 1964 stood for parliament for Huddersfield East.

Selected publications 
A History of Nidderdale (1967, Advertiser Press, 1983 and 1992, Nidderdale History Group )
A History of Harrogate and Knaresborough (1970, Advertiser Press )
Community Colleges in England and Wales (1980, NIAE )
Pennine Independency (1982, Pennine Heritage )
Pennine Valley: A History of Upper Calderdale (1994, Smith Settle )
The Yorkshire Monasteries: Cloister, Land and People (1999, Smith Settle )

References 

Academics of the University of Hull
Historians of Yorkshire
People from Nelson, Lancashire
Adult education leaders
1928 births
2017 deaths
Members of North Riding County Council